Kosmos 3 ( meaning Cosmos 3), also known as 2MS No.1 and occasionally in the West as Sputnik 13 was a scientific research and technology demonstration satellite launched by the Soviet Union in 1962.

Spacecraft
It was the third satellite to be designated under the Kosmos system, and the first spacecraft to be launched as part of the 2MS programme. Its primary missions were to develop systems for future satellites, and to record data about cosmic rays and radiation.

Kosmos 3, an automatic geophysical station, was one of a series of Soviet Earth satellites whose purpose was to study outer space, the upper layers of the atmosphere, and the Earth. Scientific data and measurements were relayed to Earth by multichannel telemetry systems equipped with space-borne memory units. It had a mass of 330 kg.

Mission
It was launched aboard Kosmos-2I 63S1 s/n 4LK. It was the fifth flight of the Kosmos-2I, and the third to successfully reach orbit. The launch was conducted from Mayak-2 at Kapustin Yar, and occurred at 04:04:00 GMT on 24 April 1962. It decayed on 17 October 1962.

Kosmos 3 was a 2MS satellite, the first of two to be launched. The second, 2MS No.2, would be launched as Kosmos 5 on 28 May 1962. The 2MS was the second of two types of MS satellite to be launched, following the first 1MS spacecraft which had been launched as Kosmos 2.

See also

 1962 in spaceflight

References

Kosmos 0003
1962 in the Soviet Union
1962 in spaceflight
Spacecraft launched in 1962
Spacecraft which reentered in 1962